Choristoneura africana is a species of moth of the family Tortricidae. It is found in Cameroon.

The wingspan is 13–15 mm. The ground colour of the forewings is pale creamy ochreous, mixed with brownish at the base and dorsum. The markings are brown with dark brown strigulae (fine streaks). The hindwings are ochreous creamy, but yellower on the peripheries.

References

Endemic fauna of Cameroon
Moths described in 2002
Choristoneura